The 1914 Denver Pioneers football team represented the University of Denver as a member of the Rocky Mountain Conference (RMC) during the 1914 college football season. In their first and only season under head coach Harry G. Buckingham, the Pioneers compiled a 5–4 record (1–4 against conference opponents), finished seventh in the RMC, and outscored opponents by a total of 186 to 114.

Schedule

References

Denver
Denver Pioneers football seasons
Denver Pioneers football